Walter Mauclerk (or Walter Mauclerc; died 1248) was a medieval Bishop of Carlisle and Lord High Treasurer of England.

Life 

Mauclerk's origins are unknown, although he had a brother who was prior of Reading Abbey. Another kinsman, possibly a nephew, Robert Barri was named prior of Carlisle Cathedral while Walter was bishop. He is first recorded as a financial clerk in Normandy in 1202, and then later that same year as holding a church in Falaise. With the loss of Normandy, he returned to England and the king's court, and received a prebend in Exeter in 1203. In 1204 and 1205 he helped administer Lincolnshire, collecting tallage other taxes. He served King John of England in Rome as an envoy to Pope Innocent III in 1214 where he was expected to neutralise any baronial agents that might be sent. At the time, he was still a royal clerk. In 1215, he was sent to Ireland, although only for a short time. He served as a royal justice in the Midlands in 1218, and as a royal justice in Nottingham in 1219, and in 1221 appointed as a forest justice in York, but was instead sent to Cumberland. He served as Sheriff of Cumberland from 1222 to 1233. He was a canon of Carlisle Cathedral before he was elected to the see of Carlisle about 22 August 1223 and was consecrated that winter.

Mauclerk continued to serve King Henry III of England, going to Cologne in 1225 as part of a diplomatic mission attempting to arrange a marriage between the king and a daughter of the duke of Austria. In 1227 he was in Poitou on the king's business. He was Treasurer from 1228 to 1233, when he was expelled from office even though he had been granted the office for life. This was a side effect of the fall from power of Hubert de Burgh during King Henry III's reign. However, with the fall from power of Peter des Roches Walter returned to royal service. In 1235 he was once more in charge of an embassy attempting to find a bride for King Henry, this time to Flanders for a daughter of the count of Ponthieu.

Mauclerk resigned the see on 26 June 1246 and died about 28 October 1248 at Oxford. He resigned the bishopric to become a Dominican at Oxford. During his time as bishop, he set the financial affairs of his diocese on a firm footing, and left most of his property to the diocese or to the Dominicans at Oxford.

Citations

References 

 
 
 
 
 
 
 

1248 deaths
Bishops of Carlisle
Lord High Treasurers of England
13th-century English Roman Catholic bishops
High Sheriffs of Cumberland
Year of birth unknown